Hippotion osiris is a moth of the family Sphingidae. It is common throughout most of the Ethiopian Region, including Madagascar and the Seychelles. Occasional vagrants have been recorded from Spain. It is uncommon on the East African coast. This species is an occasional migrant.

References

 Pinhey, E. (1962): Hawk Moths of Central and Southern Africa. Longmans Southern Africa, Cape Town.

Hippotion
Moths described in 1823
Moths of Africa
Moths of Madagascar
Moths of Seychelles